Veena Shahi is an Indian politician. She defeated Brishin Patel of JD(U) in 2000 in the Bihar Legislative Assembly election at Vaishali. She was also the Co-Operative minister in Third Rabri Devi ministry. She is the widow of Hemant Kumar Shahi (son of veteran Congress leader Laliteshwar Prasad Shahi).

References

Women members of the Bihar Legislative Assembly
Living people
Year of birth missing (living people)
Bihar MLAs 2000–2005
People from Vaishali district
Place of birth missing (living people)
Janata Dal (United) politicians
Rashtriya Janata Dal politicians
Bharatiya Janata Party politicians from Bihar
21st-century Indian women politicians
21st-century Indian politicians
20th-century Indian women politicians
20th-century Indian politicians
Indian National Congress politicians from Bihar